The 23rd Biathlon World Championships for men were held in 1987 for the second time in Lake Placid, New York, United States. The 4th women's world championships were held in Lahti, Finland.

Men's results

20 km individual

10 km sprint

4 × 7.5 km relay

Women's results

10 km individual

5 km sprint

3 × 5 km relay

Medal table

References

1987
Biathlon World Championships
International sports competitions hosted by the United States
International sports competitions hosted by Finland
1987 in American sports
1987 in sports in New York (state)
Biathlon competitions in Finland
Biathlon competitions in the United States
Sports competitions in Lahti
Sports in Lake Placid, New York
February 1987 sports events in the United States
International sports competitions in New York (state)
Multisports in the United States